Gold is the second album by Starflyer 59. It was originally released in 1995.  In 2005, it was reissued with five bonus tracks from the band's Goodbyes Are Sad 7 inch single and Le Vainqueur EP.

As with Silver, the title of their second album matches the color of the album's cover.

Track listing
All songs written by Jason Martin.

Personnel
Jason Martin – vocals, guitar, drums
Andrew Larson – bass guitar
Wayne Everett – vocal producing, backing vocals and drums on "When You feel Miserable"
Ed Giles Benrock – drums on "Stop Wasting Your Life", "Messed Up Over You" and "When You Feel the Mess"
Gene Eugene – hammond organ on "Messed Up Over You"
 Brian Gardner - mastering

References 

1995 albums
Starflyer 59 albums
Tooth & Nail Records albums